Ola Langset  (24 February 1920 – 31 July 1991) was a Norwegian schoolteacher and politician.

He was born in Straumsnes to Edvard Langset and Marta Lyngstad. He was elected representative to the Storting for the period 1973–1977 for the Socialist Left Party.

References

1920 births
1991 deaths
People from Møre og Romsdal
Socialist Left Party (Norway) politicians
Members of the Storting